Moksela is an extinct and unattested language spoken in the Sula Islands of North Maluku province in Indonesia. Based on its location, it was presumably Malayo-Polynesian of the Central Maluku branch.

References

Unattested languages of Oceania
Languages of the Maluku Islands
Extinct languages of Oceania
Languages extinct in the 1970s